Cai Zhenhua (born 3 September 1961 in Wuxi, Jiangsu) is a male former table tennis player from China. He is the vice Chairman and the Secretary of the Secretariat of the All-China Federation of Trade Unions, the former deputy Director of State General Administration of Sports, and the president of the Chinese Football Association from 2014 to 2019  and is replaced by Chen Xuyuan, the Chinese Badminton Association and the Chinese Table Tennis Association.

Career
From 1980 to 1985 he won several medals in singles, doubles, and team events in the Asian Table Tennis Championships and in the World Table Tennis Championships.

He worked as the lead coach of the Chinese men's team from 1991 to 2004, during which he played an important role in leading the Chinese team to its comeback.

In April 2007, Cai became the deputy Director of State General Administration of Sports. He was elected as the president of the Chinese Badminton Association on 18 February 2009 and the president of the Chinese Table Tennis Association on 27 February 2009. On 21 January 2014, he was elected as the president of the Chinese Football Association.

In September 2018, Cai was appointed as the vice Chairman and the Secretary of the Secretariat of the All-China Federation of Trade Unions.

References

1961 births
Living people
Chinese male table tennis players
Sportspeople from Wuxi
Badminton in China
Asian Games medalists in table tennis
Table tennis players at the 1982 Asian Games
Medalists at the 1982 Asian Games
Asian Games gold medalists for China
Table tennis players from Jiangsu

Nanjing Sport Institute alumni
Chinese football administrators